Arneys Mount is an unincorporated community located within Springfield Township in Burlington County, New Jersey, United States. It shares its name with an adjacent hill, Arneys Mount, the highest point in Burlington County. Arney's Mount Friends Meetinghouse and Burial Ground were added to the National Register of Historic Places in 1973.

References

Springfield Township, Burlington County, New Jersey
Unincorporated communities in Burlington County, New Jersey
Unincorporated communities in New Jersey